Vladislav Konstantinovich Yampolsky (born 1 November 1999) is a Russian football player. He plays for FC Volgar Astrakhan.

Club career
He made his debut in the Russian Football National League for FC Volgar Astrakhan on 11 September 2021 in a game against FC Spartak-2 Moscow.

References

External links
 
 
 Profile by Russian Football National League

1999 births
Sportspeople from Astrakhan
Living people
Russian footballers
Association football goalkeepers
FC Volgar Astrakhan players
Russian First League players
Russian Second League players